In Hawaiian mythology, kapuku or kupaku is the magic of reincarnation (see necromancy). The former word means "to restore life" in Hawaiian while the later means "to recover from a nearly fatal illness."

References
Martha Beckwith, Hawaiian Mythology (Honolulu:University of Hawaii Press), 1970:145.
Mary Kawena Pukui and Samuel H. Elbert, Hawaiian Dictionary (Honolulu:University of Hawaii Press), 1986.

Hawaiian mythology
Reincarnation